New Wilmington is a borough in Lawrence County, Pennsylvania, United States, first platted in 1824 and established as a borough on April 9, 1863. The population was 2,097 at the 2020 census. It is home to Westminster College and serves the Old Order Amish community in the surrounding Wilmington Township. It is part of the New Castle micropolitan area.

History
The town of New Wilmington was established in 1797–1798. In 1824 the first house was built and other buildings were soon erected. In 1847 an Amish settlement was established between New Wilmington and Volant. On April 4, 1863, New Wilmington was established as a half-Borough, and on April 9, 1873, it was made a full Borough. The population in 1874 was 500. As of the 2000 census, the population has grown to 2,452, which includes 1,315 residents and 1,137 college students.

A book on the complete history of New Wilmington was penned in 1999, which may be viewed at the Westminster College Library. The book includes 12 chapters of history, starting in 1797 and has over 100 photographs.

In the fall of 2014, community members led by mayor Sherie Babb, formed the New Wilmington Economic Development Committee. This group was established to encourage not only economic health, but a variety of betterment initiatives around the town.

In January 2016, LIVE New Wilmington, a promotional campaign developed and supported by the New Wilmington Economic Development Committee (EDCOM), was officially launched. The goal of this project is to promote connection and celebration as the residents join in a community that is a hub for artists and quality education, picturesque environment, and caring neighbors. Because of this, the group has chosen to focus on these areas (arts, education, environment, people) as the pillars for nurturing and fostering growth. It is believed that these qualities are unique to the community, deserve to be recognized, and should be given a larger platform for actualization.

Geography
New Wilmington is located at  (41.120713, -80.332807).

New Wilmington's ZIP code is 16142.

Demographics

As of the census of 2000, there were 2,452 people, 577 households, and 324 families residing in the borough. The population density was 2,313.2 people per square mile (893.1/km2). There were 611 housing units at an average density of 576.4 per square mile (222.6/km2). The racial makeup of the borough was 98.21% White, 0.57% African American, 0.20% Native American, 0.45% Asian, 0.24% from other races, and 0.33% from two or more races. Hispanic or Latino of any race were 0.45% of the population. 26.0% were of German, 12.6% Italian, 11.8% Irish, 9.1% English and 7.3% Scotch-Irish ancestry according to Census 2000. 97.9% spoke English and 1.2% Spanish as their first language.

There were 577 households, out of which 23.1% had children under the age of 18 living with them, 45.4% were married couples living together, 9.0% had a female householder with no husband present, and 43.8% were non-families. 35.2% of all households were made up of individuals, and 15.1% had someone living alone who was 65 years of age or older. The average household size was 2.28 and the average family size was 2.90.

In the borough the population was spread out, with 10.4% under the age of 18, 48.5% from 18 to 24, 12.1% from 25 to 44, 12.1% from 45 to 64, and 16.9% who were 65 years of age or older. The median age was 22 years. For every 100 females there were 61.8 males. For every 100 females age 18 and over, there were 58.1 males.

The median income for a household in the borough was $36,734, and the median income for a family was $56,736. Males had a median income of $36,250 versus $26,125 for females. The per capita income for the borough was $12,749. About 4.2% of families and 15.6% of the population were below the poverty line, including 7.8% of those under age 18 and 7.0% of those age 65 or over.

New Wilmington is surrounded by farms of an Amish settlement which had 19 congregations i.e. about 2,500 people in 2013.

References

External links

Populated places established in 1824
Boroughs in Lawrence County, Pennsylvania
1863 establishments in Pennsylvania